Ralph was the first cloned rat. To give birth to Ralph, 129 embryos were implanted into two females. One became pregnant and gave birth to three rats; Ralph was the first to be born. Ralph has been cloned for medical purposes requiring genetically identical animals including testing in impact of genetics and the environment in the development of many diseases, as well as to take away and modify genes, as well as to solve a problem with rat physiology. Cloned from an adult cell, Ralph was cloned by researchers from China and France.

References

2002 animal births
2002 in biotechnology
2002 in France
Cloned animals
Laboratory rats
Individual animals in France
Individual rodents
Old World rats and mice
Yvelines